John Paul Wiese (born April 19, 1934) is a senior judge of the United States Court of Federal Claims.

Early life, education, and career
John Paul Wiese was born on April 19, 1934 in Brooklyn New York City, New York to Gustav and Margaret Wiese. He graduated from Hobart College with a Bachelor of Arts in 1962, and from the University of Virginia School of Law with a Bachelor of Laws in 1965.

Wiese served in the United States Army from 1957 to 1959. He served as a staff law clerk in the Trial Division of the United States Court of Claims from 1965–1966 and as law clerk to Judge Linton M. Collins in the Appellate Division of the United States Court of Claims from 1966 to 1967. Thereafter, he engaged in the private practice of law with the firms of Cox, Langford & Brown from 1967 to 1969 and Hudson, Creyke, Koehler & Tacke from 1969 to 1974. From 1974 to 1982 he served on the United States Court of Claims as a trial commissioner.

Federal judicial service 
Wiese was appointed a Judge of the United States Court of Federal Claims on October 1, 1982 by operation of law, following enactment of the Federal Courts Improvement Act. He was nominated for a full fifteen year appointment by Ronald Reagan on September 11, 1986, and was confirmed by the United States Senate on October 8, 1986, and received commission on October 14, 1986. He assumed senior status on October 13, 2001.

References

External links 

1934 births
Living people
20th-century American judges
20th-century American lawyers
21st-century American judges
Hobart and William Smith Colleges alumni
Judges of the United States Court of Federal Claims
Lawyers from Washington, D.C.
People from Brooklyn
United States Army soldiers
United States Article I federal judges appointed by Ronald Reagan
University of Virginia School of Law alumni